Vittorio Arrigoni (4 February 1975 – 15 April 2011) was an Italian reporter, writer, pacifist and activist. Arrigoni worked with the pro-Palestinian International Solidarity Movement (ISM) in the Gaza Strip, from 2008 until his death. Arrigoni maintained a website, Guerrilla Radio, and published a book of his experiences in Gaza during the 2008–09 Gaza War between Hamas and Israel. Arrigoni was the first foreigner kidnapped in Gaza since BBC journalist Alan Johnston's abduction in 2007. He was subsequently killed by Palestinian Salafists. His murder was condemned by various Palestinian groups.

Biography
Arrigoni was born in the town of Besana in Brianza, near Monza, on 4 February 1975. He claimed that it was in his blood to fight for freedom as his grandfathers fought against the former fascist regime in Italy. He had the Arabic word for resistance (muqawama) tattooed on his right arm. Once he passed his high school exams in Italy, he left his hometown of Bulciago, a small village near Lake Como, and began working as a volunteer around the world (East Europe, South America, Africa and Middle East). 

In 2002, he visited Jerusalem which, according to his mother, was the "moment he understood his work would be concentrated there."  His mother, Egidia Beretta, is the mayor of Bulciago.

Political activism
 Arrigoni was credited as one of the many activists who revived the International Solidarity Movement (ISM), a pro-Palestinian group that works in the Palestinian territories. In August 2008, he participated in the Free Gaza mission that aimed to break the Israeli blockade of the Gaza Strip, in place since June 2007 when Hamas took power in the territory. He was on the first boat that arrived in the Port of Gaza, describing that moment as "one of the happiest and most emotional of his lifetime." 

While volunteering to act as a human shield for a Palestinian fisherman off Gaza's coast in September 2008, Arrigoni was injured by flying glass after the Israeli Navy used a water cannon to deter the vessel. In November, he was arrested by Israeli authorities after again acting as a human shield for fishermen off Gaza's coast.

He returned to Gaza prior to the Israeli military offensive Operation Cast Lead, which lasted from December 2008 to January 2009. Arrigoni was one of the few foreign journalists in Gaza during the war; he worked with Radio Popolare and as reporter for the Italian newspaper Il manifesto. He later published a book, Restiamo umani (en: Gaza, Stay Human), a collection of his reportage from Gaza. It is translated into English, Spanish, German, and French with a preface by Israeli historian Ilan Pappé.

Political views

Arrigoni was described as having a "fervent commitment to the Palestinian cause." Arrigoni described four Palestinians who died in a tunnel under the Gaza-Egypt border as "martyrs". One of his last posts on Guerrilla Radio, which he wrote hours before he was kidnapped and killed, praised Palestinian efforts to smuggle goods into Gaza via tunnels as an "invisible battle for survival."

Arrigoni criticised Muslim extremists for trying to impose a hardline version of Islam in Gaza. In an interview with the newspaper PeaceReporter, he said: "Personally, as an activist for human rights, I don't like Hamas at all. I have something to say to them too: they have deeply limited human rights since they have won the elections."

In his website, Guerrilla Radio, and Facebook page, Arrigoni described the government of Israel as one of the worst apartheid regimes in the world. He said the Israeli blockade on Gaza was criminal and villainous.

Kidnapping and death
Arrigoni was kidnapped on 14 April 2011. In a video posted on YouTube in which they identified themselves as belonging to a previously unknown group, "The Brigade of the Gallant Companion of the Prophet Mohammed bin Muslima,"  Arrigoni was blindfolded with blood seen around his right eye. The captors demanded the release of their leader Walid al-Maqdasi, imprisoned by the de facto government in Gaza a month earlier, as a ransom and threatened Arrigoni's killing if a 30-hour deadline was not met. The captors accused Arrigoni of "spreading corruption" and his home country Italy as an "infidel state."

Murder
For uncertain reasons, before the deadline expired, the captors killed Arrigoni in an empty apartment in the Mareh Amer area in northern Gaza. A witness at the scene of his death reported that he was likely either hanged or strangled. After being led to the house by a member of the suspected Salafi group, Hamas security forces stormed the building and found Arrigoni's body. 

An autopsy revealed that Arrigoni had been strangled with a plastic cord, but journalists were not allowed to see the body and no independent confirmation of the cause of death was possible. Tawhid and Jihad denied responsibility for the killing, but stated it was "a natural outcome of the policy of the government carried out against the Salafi." Iyad ash Shami, a leader of another Salafi group based in Gaza, denied involvement of Salafi militants and said the killing went against Islam. Security forces in Gaza arrested four suspects in connection to the incident, and Gaza Prime Minister Ismail Haniya ordered an investigation by the Interior Ministry, and called Arrigoni's mother to send his condolences.

Manhunt and trial
Hamas police initiated a manhunt for people involved in the murder. Hamas authorities sealed off parts of the Gaza Strip before the beginning of the operation, during which gunfire and at least one explosion were heard.

Hamas security forces laid siege to a house where the suspects were staying, in the Nuseirat refugee camp, in central Gaza. The suspects refused to surrender and a gun battle ensued. Hamas policemen entered the home and killed Balal al-Omari and a Jordanian, Abbad a-Rahman al-Brizat (one of the two dead men may have committed suicide). A third suspect, Mahmoud al-Salfiti, was wounded and detained. Three of the suspects' associates were also captured. Hamas Interior Ministry spokesman Ihab al-Ghussein reported that five Hamas policemen were injured as well as a girl who was caught in the crossfire.

The four Salafist extremists captured in the raid were charged over Arrigoni's abduction and murder in a Hamas military court. The trial was presided over by military judge Abu Omar Atallah. They were found guilty in September 2012. Mahmoud al-Salfiti, 28, and Tamer al-Hasana, 27, were sentenced to life imprisonment with hard labor: the court refrained from imposing the death penalty on them after Arrigoni's parents urged that they be spared. Khader Jram, 24, was sentenced to 10 years imprisonment and Amer Abu Ghouleh, 23, was given a prison term of one year for sheltering fugitives. Following an appeal, a military court reduced the sentences of Salfiti and al-Hasana from life to 15 years on 19 February 2013. "We asked in our appeal for the conviction for murder and abduction to be dropped to only abduction," their lawyer Mohammed Zaqut said.

In June 2015, after being granted a furlough from prison, Mahmoud al-Salfiti managed to escape from Gaza to Iraq, where he joined ISIS. On 28 November 2015 he was reportedly killed fighting for ISIS in Anbar province.

Reactions to death

Several hundred Gazans rallied in the Unknown Soldier's Square to mourn Arrigoni while about 100 Palestinians and internationals marched through Ramallah to a house of mourning in nearby al-Bireh in the West Bank. In Bethlehem, a candlelight vigil was held outside the Church of the Nativity. Egyptian authorities offered to allow Arrigoni's family to enter Gaza through the Rafah crossing and his body to be sent back to Italy via the crossing.

Palestinian response
An official statement from Hamas described the killing as a "disgraceful act" by a "mentally deviated and outlawed group." Gaza Prime Minister Ismail Haniya stated the killing "does not reflect the values, morals, or the religion of the Palestinian people. This is an unprecedented case that won't be repeated." He also said Arrigoni would be designated a martyr and a street would be named after him. Foreign minister of Hamas told he would get a state funeral. After this the body would be transferred to Egypt. Hamas spokesman Fawzi Barhoum condemned the killing as 'shameful'.

Various condemnations of Arrigoni's killing were released by other Palestinian factions with Fatah decrying it as an "act of betrayal," the Popular Resistance Committees calling it "cowardly," Islamic Jihad calling it a "grotesque crime," and Mustafa Barghouti saying it was a "shocking criminal act."  A spokesman for Palestinian president Mahmoud Abbas condemned it as an "act of treason".

International response
The foreign ministry of Italy expressed "deep horror over the barbaric murder," calling it an "act of vile and senseless violence committed by extremists who are indifferent to the value of human life." UN Secretary-General Ban Ki-Moon pressed the Gaza government to bring to justice "the perpetrators of this appalling crime."

Accusations against Israel
Although Arrigoni was killed by suspected members of the Palestinian Salafist group Jahafil Al-Tawhid Wal-Jihad fi Filastin (Al-Snajib), some blamed Israel for the murder. In spite of the fact that Hamas identified the perpetrators with a Palestinian group affiliated with Al Qaeda, Hamas spokesman Fawzi Barhoum said he suspected Israel might be responsible since the death appeared to be timed to deter foreign activists from joining a flotilla due to sail to Gaza in May to break Israel's naval blockade of the area.

Mahmoud al-Zahar, a member of the Hamas leadership, indirectly accused Israel of engineering the killing of Arrigoni in an attempt to scare off international activists from coming to Gaza. He said that "such an awful crime cannot take place without arrangements between all the parties concerned to keep the blockade imposed on Gaza". Al-Zahar offered no evidence to support his accusation.

Since these accusations have not been based on any facts they have been criticised by the German journalist Hendryk Broder as baseless conspiracy theories.

Analyses of Arrigoni
A Jerusalem Post article published shortly after Arrigoni's death cited criticism of Arrigoni by Steven Plaut, associate professor of business administration at the University of Haifa, by Fiamma Nirenstein, a Jewish member of the Italian Chamber of Deputies who was deputy chair of its Foreign Affairs Committee and chair of its Committee for Investigating Antisemitism, and by Noah Pollak, executive director of the Emergency Committee for Israel, accusing Arrigoni of being a supporter of violence instead of a peace activist.

According to The Guardian'''s correspondent in Italy, Arrigoni was "first and foremost a pacifist."  Khaleel Shaheen of the Palestinian Centre for Human Rights in Gaza, a friend of Arrigoni, described him as a "hero of Palestine". Max Ajl, another friend of Arrigoni and a fellow ISM activist, eulogized Arrigoni as "a courageous and dedicated opponent of the Israeli occupation and advocate of resistance to oppression in the Middle East and around the world."

See also
 Kidnapping of Alan Johnston (release secured by Hamas, 2007)
 List of peace activists
 List of journalists killed during the Israeli-Palestinian conflict

References

Further reading
 
 Francesca Borri Restiamo liberi, peacereporter, 18 April 2011
 English-language obituary for Arrigoni on Max Ajl's blog.

External links
 Guerrilla Radio, Vittorio Arrigoni's blog from Gaza.
 Staying Human'', a documentary film on Arrigoni.
 Vittorio Arrigoni's Facebook page.

1975 births
2011 deaths
Italian human rights activists
Italian journalists
Italian male journalists
Italian bloggers
Human rights in the Gaza Strip
People murdered in the Palestinian territories
Italian people murdered abroad
Deaths by strangulation
People killed by Islamic terrorism
Male bloggers
Palestinian solidarity activists
Journalists killed while covering the Israeli–Palestinian conflict